The first-ever hat-trick in an international match was recorded on 2 March 1878, when John McDougall scored three times for Scotland in a 7–2 win against England. Since then there have been numerous players who scored three or more goals in a single match, either in club or international football. The great majority of the scorers of a hat-trick have played for the winning side, but there have also been a few occasions when the player's team have drawn or lost the game.

Cristiano Ronaldo became the first player to reach 10 international hat-tricks when he netted three goals for Portugal in a 5–0 win over Luxembourg on 12 October 2021, and overall, he has scored 62 in his career, which is more than any other active player. According to Guinness World Records Pelé has scored the most hat-tricks in history, however, based on RSSSF's data the record belongs to Erwin Helmchen with at least 141. Pelé still holds the record for the youngest player to strike three times in a FIFA World Cup match after achieving the feat in 1958, while Ntinos Pontikas became the youngest ever to score a hat-trick in 1996. Stjepan Lucijanic equalized Josef Bican's record with the most consecutive hat-tricks in 2016, just over a century after Sophus Nielsen scored 10 goals in a single international match at the 1908 Olympic tournament, a record that was equalized four years later at the 1912 Olympics when Gottfried Fuchs netted 10 goals against Russia, and they jointly held the record for nearly 90 years until Archie Thompson broke it when he scored 13 goals in a 31–0 victory over American Samoa in 2001.

When it comes to continental competitions Michel Platini is the only player who scored two hat-tricks in the UEFA European Championship, but there have been ten players who managed to achieve the same feat in the Copa America: Ademir, Javier Ambrois, David Arellano, Teodoro Fernandez, Herminio Masantonio, Pedro Petrone, Sylvio Pirillo, Jose Sanfilippo, Severino Varela, and Paolo Guerrero. Ferenc Puskas is the only player to score 2 hat-tricks in a major international club final, achieved the feat with trebles at the European Cup finals of 1960 and 1962 for Real Madrid. Malika-e-Noor holds the record for the most goals scored in a women's football match.

The list below features association football players who achieved, held or currently hold hat-trick records, including professionals, semi-professionals, amateurs, women, in any football league, cup, official friendlies or other competition around the world.

World records 

Players in bold are still active.

Player with most hat-tricks in history (RSSSF)

Active players with most hat-tricks

Players who scored most hat-tricks for a national team

Players with most consecutive hat-tricks in history

Goalkeepers who scored a hat-trick

Defenders who scored a hat-trick

Players who scored a hat-trick of free-kicks

Records of most goals scored in a single match

Youngest players in history to score a hat-trick

Youngest player to score a hat-trick for a national team

Players  with most FIFA World Cup hat-tricks

Player with most FIFA Confederations Cup hat-tricks

Youngest hat-trick scorer in the FIFA World Cup

Youngest hat-trick scorer in the FIFA Women's World Cup

Oldest hat-trick scorer in the FIFA World Cup

Oldest hat-trick scorer in the FIFA Women's World Cup

Player with most goals in a single FIFA World Cup match

Players with most goals in a single FIFA Women's World Cup match

Players to score a hat-trick in a FIFA World Cup Final

Players to score a hat-trick in an Intercontinental Cup / FIFA Club World Cup Final

Player to score a hat-trick in a FIFA Women's World Cup Final

Player with most goals in a single match in the Olympics

Players  with most hat-tricks in the Olympics

Players who scored the fastest hat-tricks in history
Here, "fastest" is defined as the shortest span between the first and third goals.

Continental records (National Football Team)

Players in bold are still active.

Player with most hat-tricks in the AFC Asian Cup of Nations

Player with most hat-tricks in the Africa Cup of Nations

Player with most hat-tricks in the Africa Women Cup of Nations

Player with most hat-tricks in the CONCACAF Gold Cup of Nations

Player with most hat-tricks in the Oceania Cup of Nations

Player with most hat-tricks in the European Championship

Continental records (Club Football Team)

Players with most hat-tricks in the AFC Champions League

Players with most hat-tricks in the CAF Champions League

Players with most hat-tricks in the CONCACAF Champions League

Players with most hat-tricks in the Copa Libertadores

Players with most hat-tricks in the OFC Champions League

Players with most hat-tricks in the UEFA Champions League

Player with most hat-tricks in the UEFA Europa League

Youngest hat-trick scorer in the UEFA Champions League

Oldest hat-trick scorer in the UEFA European Cup

Oldest hat-trick scorer in the UEFA Champions League

Players to score a hat-trick in a continental club final

See also
Lists of hat-tricks
Fastest goals in association football
List of footballers with the most official appearances
List of footballers with 500 or more goals
List of players with the most goals in an association football game
List of world association football records 
List of most expensive association football transfers
Progression of association football caps record
European association football club records and statistics

References

Lists of association football hat-tricks
Association football records and statistics
Hat trick